Teroldego is a red Italian grape variety grown primarily in the northeastern region of Trentino-Alto Adige/Südtirol, Italy.

Description
Wine has been produced since ancient times in  "Campo Rotaliano", an alluvial plain between the rivers Adige (Etsch) and Noce. Teroldego may take its name from its traditional method of cultivation, trained on a system of “tirelle” or wire harnesses, an explanation that's more likely, albeit less pretty, than its legendary association with German dialect for gold of the Tirol. Another theory, put forth in the book "Wine Grapes"   credits a northern Italian village called Teroldege, or Teroldeghe, where documents dated in 15th century refer to the sale of Teroldego wine. It has recently been discovered to be a full sibling of the Dureza variety from France, which is one of the parents of Syrah.

The grapes ripen around the last week of September or the first week of October.

Cultivation & winemaking
The wine Teroldego Rotaliano, which is made with this grape in Trentino, has had DOC status since 18 February 1971. It is planted on about 400 hectares and is cultivated by over 300 producers.

In Australia the variety is sparsely planted and has found homes in warmer, coastal climates such as McLaren Vale and Margaret River.

Some California authorities compare Teroldego to Zinfandel, with its spicy red fruits, and hints of tar, pine, and almond, but few tasters would confuse the two varieties in a blind tasting. Its snappy acidity makes it a versatile food wine.

References

4. https://theknow.denverpost.com/2020/09/10/teroldego-wine-colorado/245037/

External links
"Kobrand Wine" profile of the teroldego grape

Red wine grape varieties
Wine grapes of Italy